Pešut (Anglicized: Pesut, Peshut) is a Serbo-Croatian surname. The surname has its root in Herzegovina, members of the family belong to the Serbian Orthodox Church (Serbs) and the Roman Catholic Church (Croats). Most members in Croatia are concentrated in the Lika region, Karlovac County and Sisak, descendants are also found in whole Slovenia, Montenegro, Bosnia-Herzegovina and Serbia.

Notables

Robert Pešut-Magnifico, Slovenian musician
George Pesut, Canadian hockeyplayer

See also
Pesut

Surnames